Valery Vasilyevich Gerasimov (born 8 September 1955) is a Russian army general serving as the Chief of the General Staff of the Russian Armed Forces and First Deputy Minister of Defence.

He was appointed by president Vladimir Putin on 9 November 2012 replacing Nikolay Makarov, and currently serves as the commander of all Russian forces in Ukraine.

Early life and education
Gerasimov was born in Kazan, Tatar ASSR on 8 September 1955. He graduated from the Kazan Suvorov Military School (1971–1973), the Kazan Higher Tank Command School, the Malinovsky Military Armored Forces Academy (1984–1987), and the Military Academy of the General Staff of the Armed Forces of Russia (1995–1997).

Commands
After graduating from the Kazan Higher Tank Command School, Gerasimov was the commander of a Mechanized Infantry platoon, company and battalion of the Far Eastern Military District. Later he was chief of staff of a Tank regiment and then of a motorized rifle division in the Baltic Military District. From 1993 to 1995 he was the commander of the 144th Guards Motor Rifle Division in the Baltic Military District and then the North Western Group of Forces.

After he graduated from the General Staff Academy, he was the First Deputy Army Commander of the Moscow Military District. He was the commander of the 58th Army in the North Caucasus Military District during the Second Chechen War between February 2001 and March 2003. His involvement in the arrest of Yury Budanov led to praise from journalist Anna Politkovskaya.

In 2006 he became the commander of Leningrad Military District. In 2009 he moved to be the commander of Moscow Military District. In 2012 he became the commander of the Central Military District. On 23 December 2010 he became the deputy Chief of the General Staff.

He commanded the annual Victory Day Parade on Red Square four times from 2009 to 2012.

Chief of the General Staff
Gerasimov was alleged to have conceived the "Gerasimov doctrine" – combining military, technological, information, diplomatic, economic, cultural and other tactics for the purpose of achieving strategic goals. The author of the original paper, Mark Galeotti, claimed it was a speech which, due to translation errors, was misinterpreted in the American press as a belligerent, rather than defensive strategic proposal.

Staff appointment up to Crimea (2012–2020)
Gerasimov was appointed Chief of General Staff following the dismissal of Defence Minister Anatoly Serdyukov on 6 November 2012. The previous Chief of General Staff, Army General Nikolay Makarov, was seen as close to Serduykov and was seen by commentators as likely to be replaced by new Defence Minister Sergei Shoigu. It has been reported that Makarov resigned, but he was formally dismissed by President Vladimir Putin.

Other changes were the dismissal of Alexander Sukhorukov from the position of First Deputy Defence Minister and his replacement by Colonel General Arkady Bakhin, formerly commander of the Western Military District. Aerospace Defence Forces commander Colonel General Oleg Ostapenko was also promoted to Deputy Defence Minister. He was promoted to the highest rank in the Russian Army, General of the Army, as of 2014.

According to the Security Service of Ukraine, Gerasimov was the general commander of all elements of Russian forces and the pro-Russian insurgents during their decisive strategic victory in the Battle of Ilovaisk in 2014, where over 1,000 Ukrainian soldiers were killed. On 15 September 2016, he and Turkish chief of staff General Hulusi Akar conducted a meeting on the future of Syria in the Ankara headquarters of the Turkish Armed Forces.

As reported in her book on Gerasimov regarding his 2019 involvement with Syria, Anna Borshchevskaya stated that:By March 2019, Valeriy Gerasimov announced that Moscow had been pursuing a strategy of 'limited action' in Syria, and one that it hopes will guide future military action. By that point it was a description of actions that had already taken place in the previous years, and more to the point, this strategy reflected a return to Soviet and tsarist methods of 'limited was'".Anna Borshchevskaya. Putin's War in Syria. IB Taurus Press. 2022.

Prelude to 2022 invasion of Ukraine to present (2021–present)
On 9 December 2021, Gerasimov issued a warning to the Ukrainian government against attempting to settle the War in Donbas using force. Gerasimov said that "information about Russia's alleged impending invasion of Ukraine is a lie." According to Gerasimov, "Kyiv is not fulfilling the Minsk Agreements. The Ukrainian armed forces are touting that they have started to employ US-supplied Javelin anti-tank missile systems in Donbass and are also using Turkish reconnaissance/strike drones. As a result, the already tense situation in the east of that country is further deteriorating."

In 2021 Gerasimov explained his doctrine to the Financial Times. On 23 December 2021, he discussed regional security issues with his British counterpart Admiral Sir Tony Radakin, Chief of the Defence Staff.

Gerasimov was involved in the planning of the 2022 Russian invasion of Ukraine. The sources say the decision to invade Ukraine was made by Vladimir Putin and a small group of war hawks around him, including Gerasimov, Russia's Defence Minister Sergei Shoigu and Putin's national security adviser Nikolai Patrushev. During the invasion, The Moscow Times considered Gerasimov to have disappeared from public view since around 12 March 2022, when he talked with the Chief of the Turkish General Staff, and 4 March, when he talked with French Chief of the Defence Staff Thierry Burkhard. Other senior siloviki (key Russian security officials), including Sergei Shoigu, Igor Kostyukov and Alexander Bortnikov, disappeared around the same time.

On 27 April 2022, Ukrainian publication Defense Express claimed that Gerasimov arrived in Izium to personally command the Russian offensive in the region. According to the Ukrainian Independent Information Agency, Gerasimov was wounded on 1 May 2022 near Izium. Two US officials confirmed Gerasimov had been in the region but a Ukrainian official denied Ukraine was specifically targeting Gerasimov and said that when the command post was attacked, Gerasimov had already set off to return to Russia. The US reportedly prevented Ukraine from killing Gerasimov.

Gerasimov discussed security issues with American counterpart General Mark Milley in a phone call on 19 May.

On 11 January 2023, Russian Defence Minister Sergei Shoigu appointed Gerasimov in place of Sergey Surovikin as overall commander of war against Ukraine. Surovikin will serve as Gerasimov's deputy. His first notable battle order in the Ukrainian theatre was to deploy the Black Sea Fleet out of Port of Novorossiysk for parts unknown on 11 January.

Awards

Russian 

 Hero of the Russian Federation
 Order of St. George (3rd Class)
 Order of St. George (4th Class)
 Order "For Merit to the Fatherland" (3rd Grade)
 Order "For Merit to the Fatherland" (4th Grade)
 Order of Alexander Nevsky (2021)
 Order of Military Merit
 Order of Honour 
 Order "For Service to the Homeland in the Armed Forces of the USSR" (3rd grade)
 Medal "For Battle Merit"
 Jubilee Medal "60 Years of the Armed Forces of the USSR"
 Jubilee Medal "70 Years of the Armed Forces of the USSR"
 Medal "For Courage" 1st Class 
 Medal "For strengthening of brotherhood in arms"
 Medal For "200 years to the Ministry of Defence"
 Medal For "20 Years of Impeccable Service"
 Medal For "15 Years of Impeccable Service"
 Medal For "10 Years of Impeccable Service"

Foreign 

 Order of the Friendship of Peoples (Belarus, 2010)
 Order of the Army of Nicaragua (Nicaragua, 2013)
 Medal "For services in the field of military cooperation" (Azerbaijan, 2014)
 Medal of Marshal Baghramyan (Armenia, 2015)
 Military Commonwealth Medal (Syria, 2016)

Personal life
Gerasimov is married and has a son.

Sanctions
In April 2014, Gerasimov was added to the list of persons against whom the European Union introduced sanctions "in respect of actions undermining or threatening the territorial integrity, sovereignty and independence of Ukraine". In May 2014, Canada, Liechtenstein, and Switzerland added Gerasimov to their sanctions listed because of Russian interference in Ukraine and his responsibility for the massive Russian troop deployment next to the Russia–Ukraine border and his inability to reduce the tensions with Ukraine which are associated with these Russian troop deployments. In September 2014, Australia placed Gerasimov on their Ukraine related sanctions list.

On 25 February 2022, the United States added Gerasimov to the Specially Designated Nationals and Blocked Persons List.

References

External links

1955 births
Living people
Military personnel from Kazan
Generals of the army (Russia)
Deputy Defence Ministers of Russia
Soviet military personnel
People of the annexation of Crimea by the Russian Federation
Russian military personnel of the Syrian civil war
Russian military personnel of the Russo-Ukrainian War
Russian military personnel of the 2022 Russian invasion of Ukraine
Russian individuals subject to the U.S. Department of the Treasury sanctions
Specially Designated Nationals and Blocked Persons List
Anti-Ukrainian sentiment in Russia
Frunze Military Academy alumni
Military Academy of the General Staff of the Armed Forces of Russia alumni
Heroes of the Russian Federation
Recipients of the Order "For Merit to the Fatherland", 3rd class
Recipients of the Order "For Merit to the Fatherland", 4th class
Recipients of the Order "For Service to the Homeland in the Armed Forces of the USSR", 3rd class
Recipients of the Order of Alexander Nevsky
Recipients of the Order of Honour (Russia)
Recipients of the Order of Military Merit (Russia)
Recipients of the Order of St. George of the Third Degree
Recipients of the Order of St. George of the Fourth Degree
21st-century Russian military personnel
Anti-Americanism
Russian individuals subject to European Union sanctions